Financial Market Supervisory Authority (Azerbaijani: Maliyyə Bazarlarına Nəzarət Palatası) better known by its abbreviation FIMSA, was the financial regulatory authority in Azerbaijan for the period of February 2016 – November 2019. Within this period FIMSA was responsible for supervising the activities of banks, non-bank credit organizations, insurance companies, stock exchanges, securities dealers and other financial intermediaries; implementation of macro-prudential supervision; participation in the preparation of normative legal acts related to the regulation of financial markets; issuing licenses in the financial markets.

History 
Financial Market Supervisory Authority of the Republic of Azerbaijan was founded as a public legal entity according to the Presidential Decree dated February 3, 2016 in order to improve licensing, regulation and supervision of securities market, investment funds, insurance, credit organizations and payment systems. According to the Order of the President of the Republic of Azerbaijan “On improving management of the regulation and supervision of financial services market” issued on November 28, 2019 the Financial Market Supervisory Authority was liquidated. The authorities of the financial market supervisor stipulated by the applicable law, including rights and responsibilities in the areas of licensing of financial market services, regulation and supervision, protection of rights of investors and consumers of financial services, as well as FIMSA’s property were handed over to the Central Bank of the Republic of Azerbaijan.

See also 

 Finance in Azerbaijan
 Baku Stock Exchange

References 

Banking in Azerbaijan
Economy of Azerbaijan
Financial regulatory authorities of Azerbaijan